Irulegi ([iɾuˈleɡi]) is the Basque name for Irouléguy, a commune in the Pyrénées-Atlantiques department in south-western France.

It may also refer to:
 A Basque surname, in Spanish Irulegui
 Irouléguy AOC, a wine
 Hand of Irulegi, an archeological artefact with Basque inscriptions
 José Antonio Irulegui, a Spanish former footballer
 Irulegi (mountain), a mountain in the Aranguren municipality in Navarre in the Spanish Basque country (Basque: :eu:Irulegi (Aranguren))
 Irulegi castle, a castle on the mountain (Basque: :eu:Irulegiko gaztelua; Spanish: :es:Castillo de Irulegui)